The Mind's Eye is a Big Finish Productions audio drama based on the long-running British science fiction television series Doctor Who. It is a three-part story written by Colin Brake and was released alongside a one-part story, Mission of the Viyrans.

Plot
The Doctor, Erimem and Peri have gone their separate ways. The Doctor is wandering on a nameless paradise planet filled with murderous primates (but only at night) and carnivorous plants. Erimem is the Queen of a space colony empire, New Cairo, and is suffering a rebellion, while Peri's stepson and new husband are causing problems to her domestic bliss.

Cast
The Doctor — Peter Davison
Peri — Nicola Bryant
Erimem — Caroline Morris
Hayton — Owen Teale
Major Takol — Rebecca Front
Kyle — Thomas Brodie-Sangster
Ukarme — Richard Laing
Andree — Nicola Weeks

Behind-the-scenes
This story leads directly into the audio drama The Bride of Peladon.

The hallucinogenic plants in this story reappear in Brotherhood of the Daleks.

Mission of the Viyrans
Mission of the Viyrans is a Big Finish Productions audio drama based on the long-running British science fiction television series Doctor Who. It is a one-part story written by Nicholas Briggs and was released alongside a three-part story, The Mind's Eye.

The Doctor and Peri encounter the time travelling Viyrans on a holiday planet.

Cast
The Doctor — Peter Davison
Peri — Nicola Bryant
 Lawrence – Peter Sowerbutts
 Chris – Philip Childs

Behind-the-scenes
Mission of the Viyrans completes the "Virus Strand" story arc, which also includes the audio dramas Urgent Calls, Urban Myths and The Vanity Box.

This story marks the first appearance of the Viyrans for Big Finish.  They first appeared in the short story "No One Died", also written by Nicholas Briggs, featuring the Tenth Doctor and published in the 2007 Doctor Who Storybook.  The Viyrans return against the Sixth Doctor in Patient Zero.

External links
Big Finish Productions – The Mind's Eye

2007 audio plays
Fifth Doctor audio plays